Sergei Aleksandrovich Pervushin (born 29 March 1970) is a Russian professional football coach and a former player. He is the manager of FC Metallurg Lipetsk.

Coaching career
On 21 October 2019 he was appointed caretaker manager of Russian Premier League club FC Tambov following the dismissal of Aleksandr Grigoryan, with Tambov in last place in the standings. On 28 May 2020, he signed a contract for the 2020–21 season as a manager of Tambov, with Tambov up to 11th position at the time. FC Tambov was dissolved after the 2020–21 season.

On 22 June 2021, he was appointed manager of FC Kuban Krasnodar, newly promoted into the Russian Football National League. He left Kuban by mutual consent on 12 August 2021.

Honours
 Russian Second Division top scorer: 2000 (Zone East, 13 goals), 2003 (Zone Center, 27 goals).

References

External links
 

1970 births
Living people
Soviet footballers
Russian footballers
Association football forwards
FC Spartak Tambov players
BFC Siófok players
FC Metallurg Lipetsk players
FC SKA-Khabarovsk players
Russian expatriate footballers
Expatriate footballers in Hungary
Russian expatriate sportspeople in Hungary
Russian football managers
FC Novokuznetsk players
FC Dynamo Vologda players
Russian Premier League managers
FC Spartak-UGP Anapa players
FC Urozhay Krasnodar managers